Thomas James Weale (31 December 1910 – 1971) was a Welsh professional association footballer who played as a winger.

References

1910 births
1971 deaths
Footballers from Merthyr Tydfil
Welsh footballers
Association football wingers
Burnley F.C. players
Crewe Alexandra F.C. players
Swindon Town F.C. players
English Football League players